Notre Dame of Dadiangas University - Integrated Basic Education Department (NDDU -  IBED) is a Catholic private University preparatory school for High School, Elementary and Pre-school students, run by the Marist Brothers of the Schools or FMS (Fratres Maristae a Scholis). It has two campuses: Barangay Lagao and Barangay Espina, General Santos. The programs below are mandated by the Department of Education in High School Students.

Curricular Program
The NDDU-IBED offers courses as mandated by the Department of Education on the Basic Education Curriculum. The courses offered per year level follow.

Courses for Grade 7 Level
Filipino 7 - Ibong Adarna 
English 7 - Philippine Literature 
Math 7 - Elementary Algebra
Science 7 - Integrated Science
Values Education 7/CLE 7 - Catholic Doctrine
Technology And Livelihood Education 7 
Technology And Livelihood Education 7 Computer 
Music, Arts, Physical Education and Health 7 (MAPEH)
Araling Panlipunan 7 - Philippine History
Additional Subjects for Science Curriculum
Earth Science

Courses for Grade 8 Level
Filipino 8 - Florante at Laura 
English 8 - Afro-Asian Literature
Math 8 - Intermediate Algebra
Science 8 - Biology
Values Education 8/CLE 8 - Catholic Worship
Technology And Livelihood Education 8 
Technology And Livelihood Education 8 Computer 
Music, Arts, Physical Education and Health 8 (MAPEH)
Araling Panlipunan 8 - Asian History
Additional Subjects for Science Curriculum
Geometry

Courses for Grade 9 Level
Filipino 9 - Noli Me Tangere
English 9 - Anglo-American Literature
Math 9 - Geometry
Science 9 - Chemistry
Values Education 9/CLE 9 - Catholic Morals
Technology And Livelihood Education 9 - Culinary and Caregiving
Technology And Livelihood Education 9 Computer-Desktop Publishing
Music, Arts, Physical Education and Health 9 (MAPEH)
Araling Panlipunan 9 - World History
Additional Subjects for Science Curriculum
Research I
Advance Biology
Advance Algebra

Courses for Grade 10 Level
Filipino 10 - El Filibusterismo 
English 10 - World Literature, Speech and Reading Comprehension (Thesis Writing)  
Math 10 - Advance Algebra, Trigonometry and Statistics
Science 10 - Physics
Values Education 10/CLE 10 - Moral and Social Issues
Technology And Livelihood Education 10 - Basic Accounting and Entrepreneurship
Technology And Livelihood Education 10 Computer - Adobe Photoshop CS6 with Basic Digital Photography
Music 10 (Piano and Guitar)
Arts, Physical Education and Health 10 (APEH)
Araling Panlipunan 10 - Economics
Citizenship Advancement Training
Additional Subjects for Science Curriculum
Advance Chemistry
Calculus and Analytic Geometry
Research II

References

External links
NDDU official website

Catholic elementary schools in the Philippines
Catholic secondary schools in the Philippines
Marist Brothers schools
Notre Dame Educational Association
University-affiliated schools in the Philippines
Schools in General Santos
Educational institutions established in 1953
1953 establishments in the Philippines